The Olympus OM-D E-M10 Mark IV is the fourth iteration of the entry-level model in the OM-D series of mirrorless interchangeable-lens cameras produced by Olympus (since 2021 OM Digital Solutions). The camera utilizes the micro four-thirds system and was announced on August 4, 2020, and launched on September 18 of the same year.

It is the first OM-D camera to feature a flip-down LCD monitor, and the first E-M10 model to include a 20 Megapixel live MOS sensor. It continues the Olympus model of including image stabilization in-body.

Features 

 20 Megapixel Live MOS sensor (Four Thirds)
 TruePic VIII processor
 5-axis in-body image stabilization (up to 4.5 stops)
 121-point contrast-detect AF system
 Flip-down touchscreen display
 Electronic viewfinder
 4.5 fps burst shooting w/AF
 USB charging
 Wi-Fi + Bluetooth
 360 shots per charge (with LCD)

Reception 
Reviews of the E-M10 Mark IV were generally positive, though the camera took some criticism for having a plastic build that differed from the previous iterations that were of metal construction.

References 

OM-D E-M10 Mark IV
Cameras introduced in 2020